The Catholic Private University Linz is one of four universities in Linz, the capital of Upper Austria, with approximately 500 students enrolled. Its roots go back to 1672 and it is a Papal faculty since 1978. It is an accredited private university but its tuition fees currently (as of December 2004) match those of Austria's public universities.

External links
 Official website of the Catholic Private University Linz
 Austrian Accreditation Council (responsible for accrediting private universities)

Universities and colleges in Austria
Catholic universities and colleges in Austria
Buildings and structures in Linz
Educational institutions established in the 1670s
Education in Upper Austria
Private universities and colleges in Austria